Yellow Spring Mill is a historic grist mill at the junction of West Virginia Route 259 and Cacapon River Road in Yellow Spring, West Virginia.  The main building is a three-story wood-frame structure, with a gable roof, clapboard siding, and a foundation of concrete and stone.  A single-story ell extends to one side.  The property includes as outbuildings two residential cottages and a storage shed, along with two mill ponds and related raceways.  The mill was established about 1896, and remained in operation as an economic mainstay of the community until 1990.

The mill was listed on the National Register of Historic Places in 2015.

See also
List of historic sites in Hampshire County, West Virginia
National Register of Historic Places listings in Hampshire County, West Virginia

References

External links

Buildings and structures in Hampshire County, West Virginia
National Register of Historic Places in Hampshire County, West Virginia
Grinding mills in West Virginia
1896 establishments in West Virginia
Grinding mills on the National Register of Historic Places in West Virginia
Industrial buildings completed in 1896